Paul Wilmshurst is a British television director. He has worked on five seasons of the Sky One/Cinemax action-adventure series Strike Back and directed on the first series of David S. Goyer's historical fantasy series Da Vinci's Demons for StarZ and BBC America. He has received an International Emmy Award and two BAFTA nominations.

Education 

He attended The Leys School, studied English at Churchill College, Cambridge and took a post-graduate course in journalism at City University, London.

Career 

After graduating, Wilmshurst started working in news and current affairs, then worked for a number of years as a researcher and director in formatted factual programmes, before persuading Channel 4 to send him to Las Vegas to make an authored documentary about a mafia lawyer. Mob Law was joint runner-up for the Joris Ivens Award at IDFA and won awards at the Las Vegas and San Francisco film festivals.
He went on to make feature documentaries collaborating with novelist Luke Rhinehart and comedian Frank Skinner, before directing two separate year-long, three-part series for Channel 4: White Tribe (with Darcus Howe) and The Gambler (with Jonathan Rendall).
He then wrote and directed a handful of dramadocs: about cocaine dealing; pseudocide; the construction of the Brooklyn Bridge; alcoholism in the workplace; and being kidnapped by the Khmer Rouge in Cambodia, telling the story of Chris Moon. Wilmshurst also wrote, produced and directed the 90-minute BBC dramatised documentary Hiroshima  - shown in over 30 countries on the 60th anniversary of the bombing - which won an International Emmy for Best Documentary and a BAFTA for Best Visual Effects, shared between Gareth Edwards, Mike Tucker and Red Vision.

In November 2008 actress Lucy Cohu won an international Emmy award for Best Actress for her role in the true-life drama Forgiven. The drama was well reviewed at the time and was later listed as one of the 50 Best Television Programmes of the Decade in The Times: "32: Forgiven (2006) It is easy to condemn child abuse. It is much harder to try to understand it, to engage with the abuser and stop it from happening. Paul Wilmshurst’s harrowing drama with Lucy Cohu showed unbelievable courage." He also wrote and directed the CBBC miniseries Runaway, produced and directed the BAFTA-nominated children's series Combat Kids, as well as directing episodes of long-running crime series Law & Order: UK, Silent Witness and Trial & Retribution.

Filmography

Television

References

External links 
  Profile page with agent Curtis Brown
  Personal website
  IMDB page

1961 births
Living people
English television directors
Alumni of Churchill College, Cambridge